Nihat Ertuğ (born 29 September 1915, date of death unknown) was a Turkish basketball player. He competed in the men's tournament at the 1936 Summer Olympics.

References

1915 births
Year of death missing
Turkish men's basketball players
Olympic basketball players of Turkey
Basketball players at the 1936 Summer Olympics
Place of birth missing